The Wharekōpae River is located in the northeast of New Zealand's North Island. A tributary of the Waikohu River (which is itself a tributary of the Waipaoa River), it rises on the slopes of Maungatapere, a  peak at the northeastern end of the Huiarau Range, and flows east, reaching the Waikohu River at the settlement of Waikohu, west of Te Karaka.

The river's name is Māori for "house with a side door", which would have been an unusual feature of a traditional Māori dwelling.

References

Rivers of the Gisborne District
Rivers of New Zealand